Igor Leonidovich Volgin (born March 6, 1942, Molotov) is a Soviet and Russian writer and historian, poet, specialist in literature.

Biography 
Igor Volgin was born in March 1942 in Molotov, where his parents were in the evacuation. Father Leonid Samuilovich Volgin (1909-2002)   a journalist. His mother, Rakhil Lvovna Volgina (1912-2002)   corrector.

In 1959 he graduated from the Moscow school No 626, from 1959 to 1964 - student MSU Faculty of History. Still during the period of study at the university he became known as a poet.

Scientific interests Igor Volgin studying the life and work of Fyodor Dostoyevsky, the history of Russian literature, the history of Russian journalism 19th century, Russian history. Volgin - author of over 250 scientific papers.

In 1997, Igor Volgin creates Dostoevsky Foundation, whose goal is to promote the study of the life and works of Russian classics, the implementation of scientific and cultural programs.

Lead author of the program Glass Bead Game on channel Russia-K.

Personal life 
Wife Katya Volgina (born September 13, 1987).

References

External links
Official site
   Фонд Достоевского

1942 births
Living people
Writers from Perm, Russia
Moscow State University alumni
Soviet poets
Russian male poets
20th-century Russian historians
Soviet historians
21st-century Russian historians
Soviet literary historians
Soviet male writers
20th-century Russian male writers
Russian literary historians
Russian television presenters
Academic staff of Moscow State University